Luis Pascual (Delmonte) Silverio (born October 23, 1956) is a Dominican former professional baseball player and coach, currently serving as the Senior Advisor to Latin American Operations for the Pittsburgh Pirates of Major League Baseball (MLB). In 2011 and 2012, he was the first-base, outfield and baserunning coach for the Pirates' major league team.

Prior to joining the Pittsburgh organization, Silverio spent thirty-five years in the Kansas City Royals' organization, and was a coach at the Major League level for the Royals from 2003–2008.  Silverio has been associated with the Royals since he signed as a non-drafted free agent on November 12, 1973.  Though he played in only eight games with the Royals in September 1978, he recorded six hits in his eleven career at bats. His .545 batting average is the highest in baseball history for any player who came to bat ten or more times in their career.  Silverio coached in the Royals minor league system from 1983 to 1989.  He was the general manager of the Royals' Dominican League entry from 1990 to 1992, the coordinator of Latin American operations from 1993 to 1999, the coordinator of Dominican operation from 2000 to 2002, and player development coordinator in 2009–2010. His daughter, Jennifer, is married to former Royals shortstop Ángel Berroa.

Silverio has two sons and two daughters and lives in Florida.

References

External links

1956 births
Living people
Águilas Cibaeñas players
Dominican Republic baseball coaches
Dominican Republic expatriate baseball players in the United States
Dominican Republic national baseball team people
Gulf Coast Royals Academy players
Gulf Coast Royals players
Jacksonville Suns players
Kansas City Royals coaches
Kansas City Royals players
Kansas City Royals scouts
Major League Baseball first base coaches
Major League Baseball left fielders
Major League Baseball players from the Dominican Republic
Major League Baseball right fielders
Major League Baseball third base coaches
Omaha Royals players
People from Santiago Province (Dominican Republic)
Pittsburgh Pirates coaches
Waterloo Royals players